Laura Street is a north–south street in Jacksonville, Florida, United States, named for the daughter of the city's founder, Isaiah D. Hart. Historically, the downtown portion of Laura Street has been considered the financial district of Jacksonville.

Description 
The street's contiguous segment runs from 12th Street in the historic neighborhood of Springfield south through downtown, terminating at Independent Drive. South of State Street, Laura Street runs through the core of downtown's Northbank, and is one of the busiest pedestrian streets in the city.

Serving as an important corridor connecting a high concentration of office blocks, the area has historically functioned as a preeminent shopping and financial district, and has remained an important economic and cultural epicenter for the region. The street is also home to Jacksonville's oldest park, Hemming Park, the Jacksonville Landing, Main Public Library, the Museum of Contemporary Art Jacksonville, and City Hall.

History 
Laura Street was named for the daughter of Jacksonville's founder, Isaiah D. Hart. In 1856, the city's oldest public park was designated along Laura Street, occupying the entire city block bordered by Monroe, Hogan and Duval Streets. The area attracted numerous hotels, most notably the St. James Hotel, completed in 1869, and the Windsor Hotel, completed in 1875.

The Great Fire of 1901 ravaged almost the entirety of today's modern downtown core, including much of Laura Street. The street did act as a fire line between the junctions of Adams Street through to the St. Johns River. Just as in the 1871 Great Chicago Fire, the massive level of destruction left in the wake of the fire precipitated a robust period growth and a building boom that would last up until the Great Depression. The corridor between Adams Street, where a remaining portion of the business district still existed, and Hemming Park, was the center of much of the more notable commercial development.

Originally the Mercantile Exchange Bank Building, one of the first buildings to be built after the fire was the Old Florida National Bank in 1902. It was designed by Edward H. Glidden in the Classical Revival style, and is now part of a group of buildings known as the Laura Street Trio. Architect Henry John Klutho designed the other two buildings: the Bisbee Building in 1908, and the Florida Life Building in 1911, both designed in the Chicago school of architecture. He also designed the YMCA Building in 1909, and the St. James Building in 1912. New York architecture firm Mowbray and Uffinger contributed two significant structures to the corridor during this period. In 1909, 121 Atlantic Place, originally Atlantic National Bank Building, opened as the tallest building in Florida. Barnett National Bank Building opened its doors in 1926, also breaking the state height record. Local architecture firm Marsh & Saxelbye also contributed multiple works along the route, including Karpeles Manuscript Library Museum (1921), Schultz Building (1926), Hotel George Washington (1926) and Greenleaf & Crosby Building (1928).

RTKL Associates Inc., a planning and consultant firm from Baltimore, was hired in 1970 to study the city's increasing urban blight related to suburbanization and the development of retail malls. The recommendations were included in the 1971 Downtown Master Plan drafted by the Downtown Development Authority. The plans called for creating a pedestrian mall, a one-way transportation loop and elevated walkways that would permitting safe movement from the retail core, centered on Hemming Park, to the riverfront. The plans further called for a riverfront park, convention center with attached hotel, an exhibition center, Sears Department Store, and a high-rise offices. Though many portions of the plan never came to fruition, a few of Laura Street's features are a result of the 1971 Downtown Master Plan, the most striking of which was the Wells Fargo Center, designed by Kemp, Bunch & Jackson in 1974 for the Independent Life Insurance Company.

In 2011, $2.3 million was spent to enhance the street by adding traffic calming features, more sidewalk space, trees with colorful uplighting and other hardscape features. In 2015, a five-block segment of Laura Street beginning at West Duval Street near Hemming Park, stretching to the Jacksonville Landing, and ending at East Independent Drive, was recognized by the American Planning Association as one of its "Great Places in America."

Notable places 

From south to north:
 Jacksonville Landing and Andrew Jackson Statue, Independent Drive
 VyStar Tower, Independent Drive
 Wells Fargo Center, between Independent Drive and Bay Street
 Bank of America Tower, between Bay and Forsyth Streets
 CenterState Bank Building, Forsyth Street
 121 Atlantic Place, Forsyth Street
 Laura Street Trio, Forsyth Street
 Barnett National Bank Building, Adams Street
 Greenleaf & Crosby Building and Jacobs Jewelers Clock, Adams Street
 Elks Club Building, Adams Street
 The Carling, Adams Street
 Schultz Building, Adams Street
 Snyder Memorial Methodist Episcopal Church, Monroe Street
 Main branch of the Jacksonville Public Library, Monroe Street
 James Weldon Johnson Park, between Monroe and Duval Streets
 Museum of Contemporary Art Jacksonville, Duval Street
 City Hall (St. James Building), between Duval and Church Streets
 Florida State College at Jacksonville downtown campus, between State and 1st Streets
 Karpeles Manuscript Library Museum, 1st Street
 Klutho Park, 1st Street

Transportation 
The Jacksonville Landing is at the southern terminus of Laura Street and offers access to the Jacksonville Water Taxi as well as other marine services.

The Jacksonville Skyway serves two stations near Laura Street:
 Hemming Park station at Monroe Street
 Rosa Parks Transit Station at State Street (central JTA bus station)

Gallery

See also 

 List of financial districts
 Economy of Jacksonville
 Architecture of Jacksonville
 National Register of Historic Places listings in Duval County, Florida

References 

 
Northbank, Jacksonville
Downtown Jacksonville
Economy of Jacksonville, Florida
Economy of Florida
Financial districts in the United States
Shopping districts and streets in the United States
Chicago school architecture in Florida